The Dead Next Door is a 1989 zombie horror film written, produced and directed by J. R. Bookwalter.

Plot 

In the near future, the world falls victim to a plague of violent carnivorous undead humans, and a black-ops elite team of soldiers, nicknamed the "Zombie Squad", has been enlisted by the government as exterminators to control the growing epidemic. While on a series of routine containment missions, the soldiers stumble upon a mysterious religious cult which wishes to protect and enable the zombies, believing them to be a punishment ordained by God. Within their compound may be a cure to the virus causing the plague.

Production 

Sam Raimi served as executive producer on the film under the pseudonym 'The Master Cylinder' using a portion of his payment from Evil Dead II. Bruce Campbell dubbed the voices of two characters, Raimi and Cmr Carpenter. The movie was produced over nearly four years, in Akron, Ohio.  Although unsure of the exact figure, in an interview director J. R. Bookwalter estimated that the film cost $125,000 to produce.

The film was shot on Super-8, which is an amateur grade film generally only used for making home movies. Everyone involved worked on the film for a deferred salary. The film is notable for highly graphic gore effects.

Critical reception 

AllMovie wrote, "very stylish for what is essentially an epic-scale home movie [...], this remains Bookwalter's best effort", comparing the film's fast pace to that of a "live-action video game".

Soundtrack 

The score for the film was composed by director J. R. Bookwalter. The soundtrack has been released on CD and in MP3 format by Tempesound.

References

External links 

 

1989 horror films
1989 films
American zombie films
1980s English-language films
1980s American films